Else Flebbe was a German figure skater. She competed in the women's singles event at the 1928 Winter Olympics.

References

External links

Date of birth missing
Place of birth missing
Date of death missing
Place of death missing
Olympic figure skaters of Germany
Figure skaters at the 1928 Winter Olympics
German female single skaters